Powsin is a neighbourhood of the Wilanów district of Warsaw. It is well known for the Botanical Garden – Biodiversity Center 

managed by the Polish Academy of Sciences. There is also a Saint Elizabeth Church built in the 14th century.

Neighbourhoods of Wilanów
Parks in Warsaw